Hardwick Hall in Derbyshire is an architecturally significant country house from the Elizabethan era, a leading example of the Elizabethan prodigy house. Built between 1590 and 1597 for Bess of Hardwick, it was designed by the architect Robert Smythson, an exponent of the Renaissance style. Hardwick Hall is one of the earliest examples of the English interpretation of this style, which came into fashion having slowly spread from Florence. Its arrival in Britain coincided with the period when it was no longer necessary or legal to fortify a domestic dwelling.

After ownership for centuries by the Cavendish family and the line of the Earl of Devonshire and the Duke of Devonshire, ownership of the house was transferred to the Treasury in 1956 and then to the National Trust in 1959. The building was ruinous and required stabilisation and a subsequent restoration.

The Hall is fully open to the public and received 298,283 visitors in 2019.

History

16th century
Sited on a hilltop between Chesterfield and Mansfield, overlooking the Derbyshire countryside, Hardwick Hall was designed by Robert Smythson in the late 16th century. Ordered by Bess of Hardwick, Countess of Shrewsbury and ancestress of the Dukes of Devonshire, it was owned by her descendants until the mid-twentieth century.

Bess of Hardwick was the richest woman in England after Queen Elizabeth I, and her house was conceived to be a conspicuous statement of her wealth and power. The windows are exceptionally large and numerous at a time when glass was a luxury, leading to the saying, "Hardwick Hall, more glass than wall." The Hall's chimneys are built into the internal walls of the structure, in order to give more scope for huge windows without weakening the exterior walls.

The house's design also demonstrated new concepts not only in domestic architecture, but also of a more modern way in which life was led within a great house. Hardwick was one of the first English houses where the great hall was built on an axis through the centre of the house, rather than at right angles to the entrance.

Each of the three main storeys has a higher ceiling than the one below, the ceiling height being indicative of the importance of the rooms' occupants: least noble at the bottom and grandest at the top.

A wide, winding, stone staircase leads up to the state rooms on the second floor; these rooms include one of the largest long galleries in any English house. There is also a tapestry-hung great chamber with a spectacular plaster frieze illustrating hunting scenes; the room has been little altered.

The architecture was influential, and in March 1608 the Earl of Salisbury, who was planning new buildings at Hatfield House, asked Bess's son-in-law, the Earl of Shrewsbury, for a plan, "any rowgh drawght of Hardwick". Hardwick was but one of Bess's many houses. Each of her four marriages had brought her greater wealth. She was born in her father's manor house on the site of the later, now old Hall at Hardwick, which today is a ruin beside the 'new' hall.

17th century
After Bess's death in 1608, the house passed to her son William Cavendish, 1st Earl of Devonshire. His great-grandson, William, was created 1st Duke of Devonshire in 1694. The Devonshires made Chatsworth, another of Bess's great houses, their principal seat. Hardwick thus was relegated to the role of an occasional retreat for hunting and sometime dower house.

As a secondary home, it escaped the attention of modernisers and received few alterations after its completion.

The famed political philosopher Thomas Hobbes died at the Hall in December 1679. For the previous four or five years, Hobbes had lived at Chatsworth House, also owned by William Cavendish, 1st Duke of Devonshire. Hobbes had been a friend of the family since 1608 when he first tutored William Cavendish. After his death, many of Hobbes' manuscripts were found at Chatsworth House.

19th century
From the early 19th century, the antique atmosphere of Hardwick Hall was consciously preserved. A low, 19th-century service wing is fairly inconspicuous at the rear.

In 1844, William Cavendish, 6th Duke of Devonshire published a book called Handbook to Chatsworth and Hardwick. It was privately printed and provided a history of the Cavendish family's two estates.

20th century
In 1950, the unexpected death of the 10th Duke of Devonshire, with the subsequent death duties (rated at 80%), caused the sale of many of the Devonshire assets and estates. At this time, Hardwick was occupied by Evelyn, Duchess of Devonshire, the widow of the 9th Duke. The decision was taken to hand the house over to HM Treasury in lieu of Estate Duty in 1956. The Treasury transferred the house to the National Trust in 1959. The Duchess remained in occupation of the house until her death in 1960. Having done much, personally, to conserve the textiles in the house as well as reinstating the traditional rush matting, she was to be its last occupant.

Today
Hardwick Hall contains a large collection of embroideries, mostly dating from the late 16th century, many of which are listed in the 1601 inventory. Some of the needlework on display in the house incorporates Bess's monogram "ES", and may have been worked on by Bess herself. There is a large amount of fine tapestry and furniture from the 16th and 17th centuries. A remarkable feature of the house is that much of the present furniture and other contents are listed in an inventory dating from 1601. The Sea Dog Table is an especially important piece from around 1600, and the Eglantine Table has an inlaid top of interest to musical historians.

Hardwick is open to the public. It has a fine garden, including herbaceous borders, a vegetable and herb garden, and an orchard. The extensive grounds also contain Hardwick Old Hall, a slightly earlier house which was used as guest and service accommodation after the new hall was built. The Old Hall is now a ruin. It is administered by English Heritage on behalf of the National Trust and is also open to the public. Many of the Old Hall's major rooms were decorated with ambitious schemes of plasterwork, notably above the fireplaces. Remarkably, impressive fragments of these are still to be seen (protected by preservative coatings and rain-shields), though most of the building is unroofed.

Both Hardwick Hall and the Old Hall are Grade I listed (the highest designation) by Historic England.

Dan Cruickshank, an historian specialising in architecture, selected the Hall in 2006 as one of his five choices for Britain's Best Buildings, a documentary series made by the BBC for television. Innovative in its own time, it would serve, three centuries later, as a source of inspiration for the enormous Main Exhibition Building at the Philadelphia Centennial Exhibition of 1876. Hardwick Hall was an ideal model for a building which was intended to merge historicism with the large expanses of glass that had become de rigueur for the main exhibition halls at international expositions and fairs in the wake of the success of The Crystal Palace constructed for the 1851 London Exhibition.

In March 2012, a £6.5m restoration was completed; this included the addition of a large restaurant. In December 2020, three years of additional restoration had been completed and further work was being planned.

In modern media
Hardwick Hall was the setting for the 10-part BBC series Mistress of Hardwick, broadcast in 1972. Hardwick Hall was used in the 1978 Connections TV series to illustrate a long series of changes that occurred in home design as a result of the Little Ice Age. The house was described in the 1985 TV documentary Treasure Houses of Britain. Hardwick Hall was used for the exterior scenes and some interior scenes of Malfoy Manor in the 2010 film Harry Potter and the Deathly Hallows – Part 1.

See also
Grade I listed buildings in Derbyshire
Listed buildings in Ault Hucknall
Chatsworth House
Stainsby Mill

References

Further reading
 Adshead, David and Taylor, David A. H. B., editors, Hardwick Hall: a Great Old Castle of Romance, Yale University Press, 2016.
 Durant, David N., Bess of Hardwick, Peter Owen Publishers, 1999 (Revised edition).
 Durant, David N., The Smythson Circle, Peter Owen Publishers, 2011.

External links

Hardwick Hall information at the National Trust
Images of Hardwick Hall taken by Photographer John Gay
Detailed Tour of the Hardwick Estate
Listing Building Images of Hardwick Hall
Hardwick Old Hall visitor information from English Heritage
Teachers' resource kit for Harwick Old Hall : English Heritage
Risk assessment information for teachers, Hardwick Old Hall: English Heritage
 Panoramic images and QuickTime VR movies here and here
 Several photographs of the exterior taken in 1989
 Floor plan for third floor from B. Fletcher, History of Architecture, (London, 1921) pg. 700
 Drawing of plasterwork over fireplaces, from F. Simpson, A History of Architectural Development, Vol. III. (London: Longmans, Green and Co., 1922) p. 267, fig. 221
 Hardwick Hall, Doe Lea Robert Smythson for Bess Hardwick, 1597 (Floor plans and plan of grounds) PDF by London Metropolitan University

English Heritage sites in Derbyshire
Grade I listed buildings in Derbyshire
Grade I listed houses
Grade I listed museum buildings
Country houses in Derbyshire
National Trust properties in Derbyshire
Tourist attractions in Derbyshire
Houses completed in 1597
Historic house museums in Derbyshire
Gardens in Derbyshire
Textile museums in the United Kingdom
Elizabethan architecture